The Canon de 6 système An XI was a French cannon and part of the Year XI system of artillery. It was part of the field artillery, and complemented the Gribeauval system.

The canon de 6 système An XI was used extensively during the Napoleonic wars. It was considered as a good intermediate between the Canon de 8 Gribeauval, considered to be too heavy for field artillery, and the Canon de 4 Gribeauval, considered as too light and lacking striking power.

One of the characteristics of the Canon de 6 is that its design is even simpler than that of the Gribeauval cannons, as it lacks reinforcing mould rings, except for the one before the muzzle.

Notes

References
 Chartrand, René 2003 Napoleon's guns 1792-1815 (1)  Osprey Publishing
 Chartrand, René 2003 Napoleon's guns 1792-1815 (2)  Osprey Publishing

External links

Artillery of France